George Washington Carver High School was a public high school within the Ennis Independent School District in Ennis, Texas, United States. It served as the high school for black students for over 40 years until the public schools were integrated in 1967. The school has since been razed.

History 
A month after graduation in 1967, it was announced that the school would be closing and students would be reassigned to Ennis High School. The school board decided to raze the building was made in February 2007, and it was torn down in June, 2007. A new early learning center, also named after George Washington Carver was erected on the site.

Notable alumni 
 Marchel Ivery, jazz saxophonist, one of the Texas Tenors
 William Stell, football player in Texas Black Sports Hall of Fame

References 

Historically segregated African-American schools in Texas
Public high schools in Texas
Schools in Ellis County, Texas